Aida Reyna (born 9 September 1950) is a Peruvian volleyball player. She competed in the women's tournament at the 1968 Summer Olympics.

References

1950 births
Living people
Peruvian women's volleyball players
Olympic volleyball players of Peru
Volleyball players at the 1968 Summer Olympics
Sportspeople from Lima
20th-century Peruvian women